Westmoreland County was one of the original Nineteen Counties in New South Wales and is now one of the 141 Cadastral divisions of New South Wales. It is to the west of Sydney in the Blue Mountains. Coxs River is the border to the north, and the Wollondilly River to the east. Campbells River is the border in the north-east, where the county extends to near Bathurst, with the Fish River part of the border. It includes the town of Oberon, and the Kanangra-Boyd National Park.

Westmoreland County is named in honour of John Fane, Tenth Earl of Westmorland (1759-1841). The Electoral district of Cook and Westmoreland was the first state electoral district for the area, between 1856 and 1859.

Parishes within this county
A full list of parishes found within this county; their current LGA and mapping coordinates to the approximate centre of each location is as follows:

References

Counties of New South Wales